, also credited as Makoto Kanoh pre-1995, is a Japanese game designer and supervisor. He was born in Kyoto, Japan.

Kano began working for Nintendo in 1974. He was one of the original designers in Nintendo's creative department. Originally, he designed toys and board games before working on the Nintendo Beam Gun series. Kano eventually became one of the lead designers of the Game & Watch series. By 1984, he was heavily involved in several Nintendo R&D1 games, including Hogan's Alley, Gyromite, and more specifically the Metroid, Kid Icarus, and Famicom Wars series. Some other projects he has worked on at Nintendo include Super Metroid, the Super Scope for the Super Nintendo Entertainment System, and Mario & Wario.

Kano is credited with creating several early Nintendo characters during the 1980s. Ultimately, his best known achievement may have been creating the concepts of the Metroid, Famicom Wars, and Kid Icarus universe.

Works

Interviews
Iwata Asks: Game & Watch Iwata Asks: Game & Watch - Development Staff Interview

References

1950 births
Japanese video game designers
Japanese video game producers
Living people
Metroid
Nintendo people
Video game artists